The Muskrat River is a river in Renfrew County, Ontario, Canada that flows into the Ottawa River at the city of Pembroke.

Course
The river begins at Edmunds Lake, one of the Champlain Trail Lakes and near the community of Garden of Eden, and heads northwest through other Champlain Trail lakes to reach the largest, Jeffrys Lake. It continues northwest, loops under Ontario Highway 17, and takes in the right tributary Buttermilk Creek just before reaching Muskrat Lake at the community of Cobden. There, the left tributary Snake River joins. The river exits the lake near the community of Meath Hill, and continues northwest, looping west and east again under Ontario Highway 17 while taking the left tributary Mud Creek at Mud Lake, and then takes in the left tributary Indian River before reaching its mouth at the Ottawa River at Pembroke.

Economy
The river once provided hydroelectric power for Pembroke.

Ecology
In the fall, thousands of swallows gather at the mouth of this river before continuing their migration south.

Tributaries
Indian River (left)
Mud Creek (left)
Snake River (left)
Buttermilk Creek (right)

See also
List of rivers of Ontario

References

Rivers of Renfrew County